Karnity  (German Groß Karnitten) is a village in the administrative district of Gmina Miłomłyn, within Ostróda County, Warmian-Masurian Voivodeship, in northern Poland.

Notable people
 Emil Friedrich Knoblauch (1864–1936) was a German botanist.

References

Karnity